Kristin Thomson is an American indie rock musician, former record label owner, activist, and non-profit director. From 1990-1997, Thomson, along with Jenny Toomey, ran the Simple Machines record label making it the first DC-based Punk label by run by women.

Biography

Record Label 
Thomson left a position at the National Organization of Women in 1990 to co-lead the Simple Machines record label. She ran the label with partner Jenny Toomey until its closure in 1997. Simple Machines was the first self-made label in D.C. to be run by women. The label was initially based out of the Positive Force House in Arlington, but eventually relocated to another home in Arlington. 

Thomson and Toomey published four editions of the Simple Machine's Mechanics Guide, a booklet that attempted to demystify the process of giving music a physical form, and helped aspiring artists learn how to release their records as cassettes, CDs, or any other physical form that was prominent at the time. The booklet sold over 2000 copies, which correlated with the significant uptick in the quantity of new, small record labels in the area. 

Simple Machines had their own clothing line called Cog Wear, which sported their logo on different clothing items. Simple Machines ceased operations in 1997.

Influence 
Throughout her time working with Simple Machines, Thomson helped to organize female-oriented events and workshops with the other female characters and figures in the D.C. Punk scene. These events spread awareness about several different issues, and made a significant impact on the lives of thousands of women as well as the D.C. Punk scene as a whole.

Music 
Around the same time they ran Simple Machines, Thomson and Toomey formed Tsunami, an indie rock band based out of Arlington, Virginia. Tsunami released four albums between 1991 and 1997. The band performed on the second stage at Lollapalooza in 1991, a large moment in the band's proliferation which led to their audience becoming more widespread.

Recent Activities 

As of 2022, Thomson is the nonprofit education, project, and research director for the Future of Music Coalition. She lives Philadelphia with her husband, Brian Dilworth.

References

External Links 
 Discography 
 Something from Nothing: Stories of Punk in Arlington - arlnow.com

American indie rock musicians
American women musicians